Hans Karl Hesse, known in later life as Carle Hessay (30 November 1911 - 1 January 1978), was a German-born Canadian painter. Although much remains uncertain of his early years, he immigrated to Canada in 1927, and later studied at art academies in Dresden and Paris. Hessay served as a Canadian soldier in World War II.  After the establishment of peace, he moved to British Columbia, eventually settling in the town of Langley, where he took up art again in the 1950s.  Some of his early paintings were done in the manner of Romantic realism. The influence of Expressionism soon became significant, with Hessay drawing on both the European and American movements, together with aspects of Emily Carr and the Group of Seven. He painted landscapes throughout his artistic life, as well as cityscapes, the Spanish Civil War, Biblical prophecy, and conceptions of the far future. A sizable fraction of his output consisted of abstract pieces. Over time, Hessay's depictions grew more symbolic, one commentator describing his late work as "brazenly metaphysical and apocalyptic". He often made his own pigments, and his style is distinguished by his use of colour, especially black. In 2014, a group of Canadian writers published poems based on his small abstracts. Hessay was the subject of a 2017 documentary film and art exhibition at the University of Victoria.

Early life
Hessay was born as Hans Karl Hesse in Dresden, Germany, on 30 November 1911. Accounts of the first few decades of his life are sometimes contradictory. He immigrated to Canada in 1927. Having begun painting at the age of fourteen, he returned to Europe and received an extensive art education at academies in Dresden and Paris. Hessay later left Germany to travel the world as a commercial mariner for many years, rising to the position of second mate. His first glimpse of British Columbia occurred at Port Alberni, when his ship arrived to load lumber. Impressed by the climate, he wanted to record the geography, sea, and rocks of the area. Hessay fought in the Spanish Civil War for a short period. In 1938, he arrived back in Canada, and went on to serve in the Second World War as a corporal in the Royal Canadian Engineers.

British Columbia
Hessay's first home in British Columbia after WWII was a shanty on Passage Island. In spite of being impaired by posttraumatic stress disorder, he took up the life of a commercial fisherman.

In 1950, Hessay moved to Langley, a town in the Fraser Valley.  He soon met Langley resident Leonard A. Woods, a former student of LeMoine FitzGerald, and a multi-talented sculptor, musician, poet, and art historian. At the time of their first meeting, Woods was reopening the sculpture department at the Vancouver School of Art. In a later recollection, Woods described Hessay as being "in a very critical condition, mentally and physically". The pair became life-long friends, and Hessay valued Woods' encouragement within a loosely knit artistic circle that included the painter Peter Ewart, along with John McTaggart, an art teacher at Langley High School.

In Langley, he opened up a sign shop, in the days when signs were still made by hand. Hessay lived in a rear curtained-off area, his furnishings consisting of a cot, hot plate, and table and chairs. When he returned to creating art in the early 1950s, these spartan accommodations doubly functioned as a studio. According to Woods, "paintings were everywhere". On weekends, he often closed his shop to travel to the Fraser Canyon and the British Columbia interior, where he panned for gold. Hessay once had a prospector's shack near the Old Alexandra Bridge, in the vicinity of Spuzzum. He enjoyed visiting First Natiions reserves, where he found social acceptance. His artistic output was initially reflective of his European training. Aware of experiments taking place in New York and California, he began to produce many works of pure or semi-abstraction, alongside his landscapes inspired by the British Columbia wilderness. A member of the Federation of Canadian Artists, he participated in group exhibits, displayed at local art galleries, and had one-man shows in British Columbia and elsewhere. Hessay died of a heart attack on 1 January 1978 while attending a New Year's dance at the Sasquatch Inn in Spuzzum. He is buried at Langley Lawn Cemetery.

Artistry

Painting materials and technique
Hessay commonly experimented with mixed media. Having an interest in the chemistry of painting, he often made his own pigments from minerals and resins gathered on his prospecting trips. Black was derived from grinding manganese. He also employed cooked fruits and vegetables, such as onion-skin dyes, potato water, and carrots. Further materials included egg white and house paint. His canvases were prepared with fifteen coats of gesso ground made according to his own formula.

In the manner of action painting, Hessay frequently painted in a free and vigorous manner, spilling and dragging pigments over one another. One of his paintings was done with a toothbrush.

Style
His early paintings from the late 1950s were in the style of Romantic realism, one critic describing them as "pretty but not sentimental". From his Dresden background, he retained the aesthetic qualities of the German Expressionist painters Emil Nolde, Max Beckmann, and Franz Marc. He appreciated First Nations art, admiring the Kwakwaka'wakw artist Mungo Martin, and he knew Bill Reid. Hessay's aim in painting was to create a "new, original experience", and his paintings typically emote drama and intensity of feeling, rather than lyricism. Many contain a predominance of strongly contrasting shapes and angles. He characteristically used colour to register a dominant emotional tone, reinforcing the thematic content. Hessay considered black to be his trademark as a painter. The monochrome ochre and setting of Abandoned Village, a painting from his Cabins to Cities series, recalls the mood of Emily Carr's Blunden Harbour. At times his landscapes have parallels to those of the Group of Seven. Some of his works lack any reference points, and fit comfortably within the history of Abstract expressionism. Other semi-abstract pieces are infused with hints of nature, commonly oriented by a feature which directs the viewer's perception. Several abstracts relate to his prospecting in their evocation of rock formations.

Themes
Hessay's paintings reference a wide spectrum of contemporary and historical material, ranging from the modern city, to scenes inspired by mythology and the Bible, the horrors of war, futuristic visions, and the place of humanity within nature. He liked his pictures to tell a story, but preferred to leave their interpretation up to the viewer. When asked once if his paintings were symbolic, he replied, "of course they are".

The artist's landscapes frequently place the observer squarely within the midst of an untamed wilderness, in the deadfall of roots and tree trunks, the chaos of fallen rocks, a great depth of snow, or the center of a great swamp. Some indirectly represent the destructive forces of history, as seen in a fairly literal view of Mount Baker in From Here to Eternity, with its overall pink ground colour; or the enameled hues of the large Magenta Fire. As a consequence of witnessing injustice and cruelty, he had a penchant for painting flames. His landscapes often contain signs or remains of human dwellings: forgotten logging camps, a prospector's shack, derelict habitations. Many paintings demonstrate his love of nature, illustrated by Above the Yalakom, with its fluid design of trees and slopes. In 1967, he created a six by nine foot mural, a depiction of a waterfall cascading from a mountain lake, for the Langley Evangelical Free Church.  In Woods' view, Hessay drew on his childhood learning steeped in the Bible, and the mural reinterprets Mount Lebanon, the Sea of Galilee, and the River Jordan in a Canadian context. His last painting, the peaceful landscape Break of Day, completed in 1977, is atypical among those of his final decade, with its use of soft harmonies and rounded contours.

Hessay sometimes used religious allusions as metaphors illustrating the conditions that threaten modern society.  The Number of Man refers to the Book of Revelation, and its complex montage of sinister apparitions and skulls is deliberately obscure. Various late works are shamanistic and metaphysical, such as the sacral Wake for a Shuswap.  This 1971 painting depicts a Secwepemc First Nations memorial taking place around a fire, the participants saturated in bright reds and blues, enveloped by the blackness of night. A few of his canvases record his experiences in the Spanish Civil War, seen in La Pasionaria (Dolores Ibárruri) at the Jarama River. Other war scenes are based on Biblical prophecy or classical history.

His ambivalence towards urban centres is captured in a small number of cityscapes, shown by The Great City, in which his crystalline treatment contrasts with the rubble-strewn setting at the base of an arched viaduct. As part of a Canada Council Explorations project, he created a series of futuristic paintings entitled The Hollow World, destined for the Vancouver Planetarium, but never exhibited in his lifetime. Imaginatively beginning in the year 3000 A.D., they reveal how civilization might unfold, when engineering feats could make possible the creation of new worlds.

Personal life
Hessay taught himself gymnastics by training on poles attached to two trees, and a 1943 letter of reference from the Canadian Armed Forces described him as an "all-around apparatus man", and being a capable instructor. Even in his sixties, he liked to entertain by doing handstands, and perform diving feats. Hessay believed that music, which he studied in his youth, was the highest art form, and he played the piano well. At the Lion's Club and the Canadian Legion, his music often paid for his supper, and he liked to listen to operas while painting. Self-educated in many ways, Hessay had an excellent knowledge of science, mythology, and ancient philosophy, and he could quote classical literature by heart.

Legacy
Hessay received minimal recognition for his paintings during his lifetime. When newspapers wrote articles on his exhibitions, they dwelt more on his person than the paintings on display.

In 1980, a retrospective of Hessay's life and art was held at the Langley Centennial Museum in Fort Langley, curated by Warren Sommer. It included photographs, watercolours, and oil paintings. Writing for the Vancouver Sun, Brenda White declared that "inside the exhibition space is the still ringing voice of a man who reached into his soul to understand the world he reached out to embrace", and for all their diversity, "the themes originate from the same deep well of emotion and restlessness".

His artworks were next exhibited in the Grain Elevator Gallery in Dawson Creek in 1984, a month-long exhibition. The Toronto art critic Jennifer Oille, while regarding skeptically the events of Hessay's life, described the works as ranging from objective landscape to mindscapes and expressionist symbols.

In 2005, Leonard Woods authored a slim coffee-table book, Meditations on the Paintings of Carle Hessay (Trabarni, 2005), an exploration of the thematic content of the artist's paintings.

Four paintings of Hessay's The Hollow World series appeared in public for the first time, in 2009 at the juried exhibition, Universe Inspired Art by Canadian Artists, sponsored by the NRC Herzberg Institute of Astrophysics. The scenes were accompanied by poems from bill bissett, Leonard A. Woods, and Terence Young.

The 2014 book, For Kelly, with Love: Poems on the Abstracts of Carle Hessay (Treeline Press), arranged and edited by Maidie Hilmo, commemorated an unusual project in homage of Kelly Parsons, a Victoria poet and medievalist, who died of breast cancer in 2008. Sixteen Canadian poets were invited to finish a project contemplated by Parsons, but never begun due to her declining health, by each writing one or more poems inspired by Hessay's small abstracts. The collaborative effort included poets such as bill bissett, Patrick Friesen, Linda Rogers, and Patricia Young, among others. In her contribution, Dorothy Field links how Hessay applied "black ink like tar", to Parsons' use of her hands in making arts and crafts, both "undamming the heart". Several poets felt a kinship between writing poems and painting.  The abstracts spun a variety of responses: divination of personal relationships, glimpsed mythical forces, expressions of mirth, even Oscar Wilde. The book launch, at the Templed Mind Gallery in Victoria, featured the authors reading their poems, and concluded with a talk on Kelly Parsons by Kathryn Kerby-Fulton, a medieval scholar who knew Parsons well.

Arleen Paré wrote two poems, She Asked For Birds, and City Slants, after a pair of untitled paintings by Hessay.  They appeared in her 2015 book, He Leaves His Face in the Funeral Car (Caitlin Press).

A documentary film about Hessay, directed by Guochen Wang, screened at the University of Victoria in 2017, in conjunction with an exhibit displaying some of Hessay's futurist views, renditions of the Spanish Civil War, and wilderness landscapes. The film, narrated by Linda Rogers, consists of interviews with twelve people who either knew the artist personally, or were familiar with his work. It closes with bisset's performance of his poem letting th brush dance, which reimagines Hessay's process of creating an action painting.

Hessay's works are represented in the collections of the Langley Centennial Museum and the Penticton Art Gallery. His 1968 painting Port City appeared on the cover of the book Late Modernism and Expatriation, edited by Lauren Arrington, and published in 2022 by Clemson University Press in association with Liverpool University Press.

Exhibitions of paintings
 Village Art Centre – West Vancouver, 25 February to 13 March 1965"Carl Hessay has city art display", 25 February 1965.
 Buchanan Gallery - Vancouver, Oct–Nov 1966.
 Richmond Arts Centre - Richmond, Sep–Oct 1969. Sixty piece exhibition.
 Stanley Park – Vancouver, annual exhibitions, until at least 1971
 Mind and Matter Gallery (Arnold Mikelson, owner) – White Rock, 1971, 1979
 C Hessay: Signs and Posters, Surrey Centennial Arts Centre – Surrey, 19 June to 8 July 1972
 New Westminster Art Gallery - New Westminster, 11 to 16 September 1972
 Heritage House Gallery – Langley, 12–20 October 1973
 Langley Arts Centre – Langley, 7–8 May 1977
 Langley Centennial Museum – Fort Langley, June 1980
 Dawson Creek Grain Elevator Gallery – Dawson Creek, May 1984
 Templed Mind Gallery – Victoria, March 2014
 Audain Gallery, University of Victoria – Victoria, 14 to 17 May 2017

Gallery

Landscapes

Abstracts

Cabins to Cities series

The Hollow World series

The Spanish Civil War and Biblical prophecy

Notes

Citations

Sources

External links 

 Carle Hessay: Canadian Artist (1911–1978) 
 Artists in Canada 
 British Columbia Artists

Videos
Canadian Art Inspired by the Universe Includes eight paintings by Carle Hessay (seen from 17:38 to 21:00). National Research Council of Canada, Herzburg Institute of Astrophysics (NRC).  Gary Sedun, compiler (2009).
Colour and Sound Highlights Poetry readings from For Kelly, with Love: Poems on the Abstracts of Carle Hessay. Director: Guochen Wang. Templed Mind Gallery, Victoria, British Columbia. March 5, 8–9, 2014. 
Carle Hessay exhibition at the University of Victoria, Audain Gallery Director: Guochen Wang. Piano: Carle Hessay, from a 1960s recording (May 2017).

1911 births
1978 deaths
Canadian Army personnel of World War II
Royal Canadian Engineers soldiers
Artists from Dresden
People from Langley, British Columbia (city)
German Expressionist painters
20th-century German painters
Abstract expressionist artists
20th-century Canadian painters
Canadian male painters
Canadian landscape painters
Canadian alumni of the École des Beaux-Arts
German emigrants to Canada
20th-century German male artists
German male painters
20th-century Canadian male artists